Donato Giancola is an American artist specializing in narrative realism with science fiction and fantasy content.

Biography
Donato Giancola was born and raised in Colchester, near Burlington, in the state of Vermont. He currently resides in Brooklyn with his wife and two daughters.

Giancola first majored in electrical engineering at the University of Vermont, but left for Syracuse University to seriously pursue painting in 1989. He graduated with a BFA in 1992.

Giancola describes himself and his work as a 'classical-abstract-realist working with science fiction and fantasy' and lists Hans Memling, Jan van Eyck, Velázquez, Caravaggio, Vermeer, Piet Mondrian, Rembrandt, Rubens and Titian as his favorite artists.

Giancola has illustrated cards for the Magic: The Gathering collectible card game. He has been described as a "cult hero" among fantasy collectible card game players. In 2008, the Bennington Banner referred to him as "arguably the most popular and successful sci-fi/fantasy artist working today".

In 2021 U.S. Postal Service announced that a "three ounce" stamp featuring Ursula K. Le Guin would be issued later that year, featuring a portrait of Le Guin based on a 2006 photograph, against a background scene from "The Left Hand of Darkness", created by Giancola and art director Antonio Alcalá.

Honors
Giancola's work has won many awards and accolades with highlights including:
 Hamilton King Award for Excellence, Society of Illustrators, 2008.
 World Fantasy Award: Best Artist, 2004.
 Eighteen Chesley Awards from the Association of Science Fiction & Fantasy Artists (ASFA) including their award for Artistic Achievement in 2002.
 Several Silver and Gold Awards as well as Honorable Mention from Spectrum's Best of Contemporary Fantastic Art.
 Hugo Award for Best Professional Artist, 2006, 2007, 2009; also nominated six times.
 Several Awards of Merit, Society of Illustrators, 'Our Own Show' exhibitions.
 Two Best of Shows Award and Best Professional Artist, Lunacon Science Fiction Convention
 Art Renewal Center, International Salon 2004, first place, figurative category.

Art exhibitions
 Donato Giancola: From Middle Earth to Outer Space and Beyond, Huntsville (Alabama) Museum of Art, 2013-2014.
 Magical Adventures: Fantasy Art from The Frank Collection, University of Maryland, College Park, 2004.
 Illustrators, The Society of Illustrators Annual Exhibition of Illustration, 128 East 63rd Street, New York, New York. 1999-2004.
 The Art of 'The Lord of the Rings', Exhibition of book cover and interior illustration, Bailey/Howe Library, University of Vermont, 2002.

References

External links
 Donato Giancola Official website
 
 Donato Giancola page at The Association of Science Fiction & Fantasy Artists
 The Cover Art of Donato Giancola
 SF Artists: Donato Giancola wiki profile with list of covers
 
 
 Donato Giancola's Gallery with biography and artbooks on Inside Your ART

20th-century American painters
21st-century American painters
American illustrators
American male painters
American speculative fiction artists
Analog Science Fiction and Fact people
Fantasy artists
Game artists
Hugo Award-winning artists
Living people
Role-playing game artists
Science fiction artists
Syracuse University alumni
World Fantasy Award-winning artists
Year of birth missing (living people)